José Carlos Caetano Xavier is a Portuguese scientist (marine biologist) and polar explorer.

Early life and education
Xavier graduated from University of Algarve with a master's degree in Marine Biology in 1997 and earned a Ph.D. from the University of Cambridge (Queen's college) in 1999.  he has carried out seven research expeditions in Antarctica since 1997.

Career
Xavier is a professor and principal investigator of the Institute of Marine Research of the University of Coimbra(Portugal) and at the British Antarctic Survey.

He was one of the leading scientists for the implementation of the national research program PROPOLAR and of the educational program LATITUDE60!, during the International Polar Year.

Xavier co-founded the Association of Polar Early Career Scientists and is also a member of the Education and Outreach sub-committee of the International Polar Year.

He was involved in the institutional efforts for Portugal to join the Scientific  Committee for Antarctic Research (2006), European Polar Board (2007) and signing the Antarctic Treaty (2010). He co-led Portugal's polar science, education and outreach activities during the International Polar Year.

Investigation interests

Awards
In 2011, Xavier was the youngest recipient of the Martha T. Muse Prize for his work on science and politics in the Antarctic

Books

References

External links
 Official Blog

1975 births
Living people
Explorers of Antarctica
Portuguese biologists
Portuguese ornithologists
Antarctic scientists
Teuthologists